Mann & Stern was an architectural partnership in Arkansas of Eugene John Stern (1884-1961) and George Richard Mann (1856-1939).

A number of their works are listed on the National Register of Historic Places.

Works include (with attribution):
Arkansas State Capitol
Little Rock Central High School
Albert Pike Hotel
Arkansas Consistory
Arlington Hotel
Fordyce Bath House
Arkansas Bank & Trust Company, 103 Walnut St. Newport, AR (Mann & Stern), NRHP-listed
Exchange Bank, Washington and Oak Sts. El Dorado, AR (Mann & Stern), NRHP-listed
Little Rock High School, 14th and Park Sts. Little Rock, AR (Almand, Delony, Mann, Stern & Wittenbrg), NRHP-listed
Little Rock Y.M.C.A., 524 Broadway St. Little Rock, AR (Mann & Stern), NRHP-listed
Municipal Building, 204 N. West Ave. El Dorado, AR (Mann & Stern), NRHP-listed
Riceland Hotel, Third and Main Sts. Stuttgart, AR (Mann & Stern), NRHP-listed
Union County Courthouse, Union Sq. El Dorado, AR (Peterson/Mann & Stern), NRHP-listed
Part of the El Dorado Commercial Historic District, El Dorado, AR (Mann, George R. & Howard Stern), NRHP-listed

Howard Seymour Stern (1910–2002), son of Eugene, also trained as an architect.

References

https://www.cardcow.com/213066/albert-pike-consistory-little-rock-arkansas/

Architecture firms based in Arkansas